Bught Park (Gaelic: Pàirc nam Bochd ) is the largest park in the city of Inverness, Scotland, and is situated on the western bank of the River Ness. It is home to the Inverness Highland Games and a small scale outdoor music festival. It is located next to the city's sports centre, swimming pool and BMX track.  The Bught Park is also the name for the sports stadium situated within the confines of the park which regularly hosts both the Camanachd Cup Final and the Composite Rules Shinty/Hurling Internationals and is considered one of the finest parks in shinty. It is also home to Inverness Shinty Club who have played there since the 1920s. The park is situated on land that was formerly the Bught House estate. An 18th century stately home on the site was demolished for the creation of the Ice Centre in the 1960s.

The capacity of the stadium is 5000, comprising standing and the wooden grandstand. The stadium was the centre of controversy in June 2009 when Highland Council, having evicted Inverness City from the Northern Meeting Park offered the use of the facility to the football team without consulting with the shinty club.

References

Geography of Inverness
Sports venues in Inverness
Parks in Highland (council area)
Shinty venues
Scottish Women's Premier League venues